Terphothrix is a genus of moths in the subfamily Lymantriinae. The genus was erected by William Jacob Holland in 1893.

Species
Terphothrix callima (Bethune-Baker, 1911) western Africa
Terphothrix lanaria Holland, 1893 Gabon
Terphothrix seydeli Collenette, 1954 Congo
Terphothrix tenuis (Holland, 1893) western Africa

References

Lymantriinae